The Superior North Catholic District School Board (SNCDSB, known as English-language Separate District School Board No. 34B prior to 1999) is a separate school board in the Canadian province of Ontario, with jurisdiction for the operation of Catholic schools in the remote areas of Thunder Bay District.

Superior North Catholic District School Board is a small board located in Northwestern Ontario and covers a vast area. The board only provides elementary (Kindergarten to grade 8) education; there are no secondary schools in the board. The board serves the communities of Geraldton, Longlac, Manitouwadge, Marathon, Nakina, Nipigon, Red Rock, Schreiber and Terrace Bay.  Its head office is located in Terrace Bay.

Elementary schools
Holy Angels School, Schreiber
Holy Saviour School, Marathon
Our Lady of Fatima School, Longlac
Our Lady of Lourdes School, Manitouwadge
St. Brigid School, Nakina
St. Edward School, Nipigon
St. Hilary School, Red Rock
St. Joseph School, Geraldton
St. Martin School, Terrace Bay

See also
List of school districts in Ontario
List of high schools in Ontario

References

Education in Thunder Bay District
Roman Catholic school districts in Ontario